The rivière du Monument (English: Monument River) flows in the municipality of Saint-Théophile, in the Beauce-Sartigan Regional County Municipality, in the administrative region of Chaudière-Appalaches, in Quebec, in Canada. The Monument River is a tributary of the south bank of the rivière du Loup, which drains on the east bank of the Chaudière River; the latter flows northward to empty on the south shore of the St. Lawrence River.

Toponymy 
The toponym Rivière du Monument was made official on December 5, 1968, at the Commission de toponymie du Québec.

See also 

 List of rivers of Quebec

References 

Rivers of Chaudière-Appalaches
Beauce-Sartigan Regional County Municipality